Patrick McDermott (1859–1942) was an Irish nationalist politician. A member of the Anti-Parnellite Irish National Federation, he was elected to the United Kingdom House of Commons as Member of Parliament (MP) for North Kilkenny at a by-election in 1891. He resigned his seat in 1902.

References

External links 
 

1859 births
1942 deaths
Members of the Parliament of the United Kingdom for County Kilkenny constituencies (1801–1922)
Anti-Parnellite MPs
UK MPs 1895–1900
UK MPs 1886–1892
UK MPs 1892–1895
UK MPs 1900–1906